Spikethumb frogs  are a genus (Plectrohyla) of frogs in the family Hylidae found in Central America from southern Mexico through Guatemala and northern El Salvador to central and northern Honduras. A major revision of the Hylidae moved an additional 21 species to this genus from the genus Hyla. The additional species moved to Plectrohyla were considered a separate group, and were identified as the Hyla bistincta group, also called the Plectrohyla bistincta group. They are called spikethumb because of the spike on their thumbs, which is called a prepollex. The genus name comes from the Greek word plēktron ("spur")  and hyla (the genus in which it was formerly placed).

Species
The following species are recognized in the genus Plectrohyla:

References

External links
 . 2007. Amphibian Species of the World: an Online Reference. Version 5.1 (10 October 2007). Plectrohyla. Electronic Database accessible at http://research.amnh.org/herpetology/amphibia/index.php. American Museum of Natural History, New York, USA. (Accessed: Apr 22, 2008).
  [web application]. 2008. Berkeley, California: Plectrohyla. AmphibiaWeb, available at http://amphibiaweb.org/. (Accessed: Apr 22, 2008).
  taxon Plectrohyla at http://www.eol.org.

Hylinae
 
Taxa named by Paul Brocchi